Alexandre Herchcovitch (born 21 July 1971) is a Brazilian fashion designer. His designs have been at fashion shows in New York, Paris, London and São Paulo Fashion Weeks. Best known for avant-garde designs and eclectic prints, his trademark skulls became an icon of Brazilian youth in the 1990s.

Early life
Herchcovitch was born in São Paulo, Brazil. He is of Jewish descent; his grandparents immigrated to Brazil from Poland and Romania. He had his first contact with fashion through his mother, Regina, at the age of 10, when she gave him basic lessons of modelling and sewing at Herchcovitch's request. Regina started to wear the clothes he made in parties, which led him to sell his collections to friends. In his teens, Herchcovitch used to go to the alternative clubs of São Paulo nightlife, but at the same time he studied at a Religious Zionist Orthodox Jewish school, a conflict that had a strong influence over his work afterwards.

Products
Selected products of his are sold in the United States, Canada, England, France, Spain and Australia. His first store in Tokyo has recently opened. Herchcovitch chose Tokyo where a good part of his collections are purchased and where he has become somewhat of a fashion guru. The  store, which sits in the hip Daikanyama district carries his men's, women's and denim collections and is operated in partnership with Japanese fashion distributor and retailer H.P. France.

Honors
In 2014, Herchcovitch became the first Brazilian fashion designer to receive the Ordem do Mérito Cultural.

References

External links
 Alexandre Herchcovitch's Information Biographia
 Alexandre Herchcovitch's official website

 
 Alexandre Herchcovitch's 2008 Menswear Collection on JCReport. om 

1971 births
Brazilian fashion designers
LGBT fashion designers
LGBT Jews
Jewish fashion designers
Brazilian Jews
People from São Paulo
Brazilian people of Polish-Jewish descent
Brazilian people of Romanian-Jewish descent
Living people
High fashion brands
21st-century Brazilian LGBT people